Sydney  Leicester Conabere (8 July 191815 July 2008) was an Australian actor. He was notable for his work in theatre, film and television drama in a career spanning more than fifty years. In 1962 Conabere won the Logie award for Best Actor, for his performance in the television play The One Day of the Year. He worked prolifically as a stage actor from 1938 to 1989, particularly with the Melbourne Theatre Company and Melbourne Little Theatre, sharing the stage (and applause) with Irene Mitchell in, for example, Lilian Hellman's The Little Foxes.

Conabere had an extensive career as a character actor from the 1950s to the 2000s, regularly appearing in popular Australian television serials, including Emergency, Matlock Police and Homicide. He worked for a short period in the United Kingdom, appearing in the drama serials Z Cars and Sherlock Holmes, the comedy Please Sir!, and in the crime film Man of Violence.

In the 1980s Conabere reached a wider international audience, making occasional appearances in two long running Australian soap operas, in Neighbours as Dan Ramsay and as Doug Palmer in Sons and Daughters.

Sydney Conabere died in Sydney, Australia on 15 July 2008, aged 90.

Selected filmography

The Duke in Darkness (1957, TV Movie)
Sound of Thunder (1957, TV Movie)
The Small Victory (1958, TV Movie)
Captain Carvallo (1958, TV Movie)
Wild Life and Christmas Belles (1958, TV Movie)
One Morning Near Troodos (1959, TV Movie)
Till Death Do Us Part (1959, TV Movie)
Emergency (1959, TV Series) – George Rogers
The Big Day (1959, TV Movie)
Ned Kelly (1959, TV Movie)
Outpost (1959, TV Movie) – Signaller Tiger Lyons
Eye of the Night (1960, TV Movie)
The End Begins (1961, TV Movie)
The Devil Makes Sunday (1962, TV Movie) – Clay
She'll Be Right (1962, TV Movie) – Bluey
You Can't Win 'Em All (1962, TV Movie) – Corrigan Blake
The One Day of the Year (1962, TV Movie)
Murder in the Cathedral (1962, TV Movie)
Uneasy Paradise (1962, TV Movie) – Billy
Corruption in the Palace of Justice (1964, TV Movie)
Everyman (1964, TV Movie) – Confession
The Physicists (1964, TV Movie)
Luther (1964, TV Movie)
Daphne Laureola (1965, TV Movie)
 Homicide (TV Series, 1965–1976) 
Plain Jane (1966, TV Movie)
 Hunter (TV Series, 1967, 1968) 
 Sherlock Holmes (TV Series, 1968)
 Please Sir! (TV Series, 1969) 
Man of Violence (1970) – Alec Powell
Cool It Carol! (1970) – Lazlo
 Z Cars (TV Series, 1970) 
Country Town (1971) – Ted Atkins
 Division 4 (TV Series, 1971–1974)
 Matlock Police (TV Series, 1971–1976)
A Taste for Blue Ribbons (1973, TV Series) – John Emmet
Petersen (1974) – Annie's Father
The Trespassers (1976) – Harry
Blue Fire Lady (1977) – Mr. Bartlett
Sons and Daughters (1982–1984, TV Series) – Doug Palmer
A Country Practice (1983–1993, TV Series) – Reg Brundle / Alec Hales/Eddie Marshall

The Big Hurt (1986) – O'Neal
Neighbours (1986–1988, TV Series) – Dan Ramsay
 Poor Man's Orange (TV Mini-Series, 1987)
 The Harp in the South (TV Mini-Series, 1987) 
Heaven Tonight (1990) – Priest
Greenkeeping (1992) – Milton
E Street (1992, TV Series) – Grandpa Windsor
Home and Away (1994, TV Series) – Gerry
Heartbreak High (1996, TV Series) – Jack Shaw
All Saints (1998–2002, TV Series) – William Belden / Maurie Taylor (final appearance)

References

External links

1918 births
2008 deaths
20th-century Australian male actors
21st-century Australian male actors
Australian male film actors
Australian male stage actors
Australian male television actors
Male actors from Melbourne
People from Footscray, Victoria